Night diving is underwater diving done during the hours of darkness. It frequently refers specifically to recreational diving which takes place in darkness. The diver can experience a different underwater environment at night, because many marine animals are nocturnal.

There are additional hazards when diving in darkness, such as dive light failure. This can result in losing vertical visual references and being unable to control depth or buoyancy, being unable to read instruments such as dive computers and diving cylinder contents gauges, and potential separation from the rest of the diving group, boat, or shore cover. Even with a functioning light, these hazards are still present in night diving. Backup lights are recommended. 

Normal requirements for night diving are a dive light, and adequate protection from exposure.  Some precautions and skills for night diving include: avoiding shining the light in other divers' eyes, to be aware of and use surface light signals for bearings, and if appropriate to use an illuminated shotline buoy. A surface marker buoy with an attached strobe light or cyalume stick can be used to indicate the position of the divers to the surface team. The use of a strobe light by a diver under water can damage the night vision of other divers.

Training and certification
Several diver certification agencies offer specialty training in night diving, but professional diver training will usually include it in entry level training as it is considered a normal part of occupational diving.

Recovering divers
If the team surfaces away from the boat, dive lights can be used to signal the dive boat. A surface marker buoy can be illuminated with a dive light at night to increase the visibility of the dive team to the boat. Mirrors or other reflective surfaces can also be used to increase visibility of the team on the surface.

References

External links
Night Diving Guide
https://web.archive.org/web/20160303183616/http://www.divinglore.com/RecreationalNightDiving.htm

Underwater diving procedures